Follow Me may refer to:

Film and television

Film
 Follow Me, a 1969 film scored by Stu Phillips
 Follow Me! (film), a 1972 British comedy-drama directed by Carol Reed
 Follow Me (film), a 1989 German drama directed by Maria Knilli
 Follow Me, a 2006 short film featuring John Boyd
 Follow Me, also known as No Escape, a 2020 American horror film

Television
 Follow Me TV (Canada), a multicultural community television channel
 Follow Me TV (Taiwan), now FTV One, a digital television channel
 Follow Me! (TV programme), a 1970s British English-language training programme
 "Follow Me", an episode of Beavis and Butt-head

Theater
 Follow Me (musical), a 1916 Broadway production
Follow Me a popular vaudeville production staged from 1922 to 1924 with performers including Susie Sutton

Music

Albums
 Follow Me..., by Crispian St. Peters, 1966
 Follow Me (Bearfoot album) or the title song, 2006
 Follow Me (Do album) or the title song originally by Melanie C (see below), 2006
 Follow Me (Isac Elliot album), 2014
 Follow Me, by Kimiko Itoh, 1988
 Follow Me, by Hepa/Titus, a band featuring Kevin Rutmanis, 2012

Songs
 "Follow Me" (2NE1 song) or "Try to Follow Me", 2010
 "Follow Me" (Amanda Lear song), 1978
 "Follow Me" (Antique song), 2002
 "Follow Me" (Atomic Kitten song), 2000
 "Follow Me" (Demis Roussos song), 1982
 "Follow Me" (Hardwell song), 2015
 "Follow Me" (Melanie C song), 1999; covered by Do (2006)
 "Follow Me" (Muse song), 2012
 "Follow Me" (Uncle Kracker song), 2001
 "Follow Me", by Aly-Us, 1992
 "Follow Me", by ApologetiX from Grace Period, 2002 (Uncle Kracker parody song)
 "Follow Me", by Beat Crusaders from REST CRUSADERS, 2010
 "Follow Me", by Big Bang from Big Bang, 2009
 "Follow Me", by Chicago from Chicago 16, 1982
 "Follow Me", by E-girls from Lesson 1, 2013
 "Follow Me", by Gamma Ray from No World Order, 2001
 "Follow Me", by Jamie Lynn Spears from Zoey 101: Music Mix, 2005
 "Follow Me", by John Denver from Take Me to Tomorrow, 1970
 "Follow Me", by Johnny Mathis from Faithfully, 1959
 "Follow Me", by lyme and cybelle, 1966
 "Follow Me", by P.O.D. from The Fundamental Elements of Southtown, 1999
 "Follow Me", by Pain from Cynic Paradise, 2008
 "Follow Me", by Pat Metheny Group from Imaginary Day, 1997
 "Follow Me", by Paul McCartney from Chaos and Creation in the Backyard, 2005
 "Follow Me", by Pnau from Sambanova, 1999
 "Follow Me", by Rory Gallagher from Top Priority, 1979
 "Follow Me", by Savatage from Edge of Thorns, 1993
 "Follow Me", by September from Dancing Shoes, 2007
 "Follow Me", by Thirteen Senses from Contact, 2007
 "Follow Me", by Tkay Maidza from Tkay, 2016
 "Follow Me", by Transit from Joyride, 2014
 "Follow Me", by Usher from Confessions, 2004
 "Follow Me", by Wild Orchid from Wild Orchid, 1997
 "Follow Me", from the musical Camelot, 1960

Other uses
 Follow Me (novel), a 2020 novel by Kathleen Barber
 Follow Me (sculpture), a U.S. Army memorial statue at Fort Benning, Georgia
 Follow Me!, a 1983 children's book by Mordicai Gerstein
 Follow-me, a private branch exchange telephone-system feature
 FollowMe Tandem, a coupling system that converts a bike into a trailer bike
 "Follow Me", the motto of the United States Army Infantry School

See also